The Polikarya is the highest waterfall in Sochi, Russia. It is fed by one of the glaciers of the Aibga Ridge. Even in June, the slope is covered with snow. The waterfall is located in the Adlersky District not far from Krasnaya Polyana. It is part of the Sochi National Park. Its height is 70 metres.

Other Sochi waterfalls 
 Ivanovsky
 Orekhovsky

Waterfalls of Russia
Sochi
Landforms of Krasnodar Krai